The Battle of Mulhouse took place on 29 December 1674 in Alsace, part of Turenne's Winter Campaign during the Franco-Dutch War. It was fought by the French army under Turenne and part of Alexander von Bournonville's Imperial army commanded by Hermann of Baden-Baden.

Following the inconclusive Battle of Entzheim on 4 October, the Imperial army took up winter quarters around Colmar. Rather than doing the same, Turenne split up his army and traveled through the Vosges Mountains before reforming it near Belfort. Taken by surprise, Bournonville sent Hermann to hold Mulhouse, where he was attacked and defeated by Turenne on 29 December. Another French victory at the Battle of Turckheim on 5 January 1675 forced the Imperials to withdraw from Alsace.

Background
In the 1667–1668 War of Devolution, France captured most of the Spanish Netherlands before the Triple Alliance of the Dutch Republic, England and Sweden forced them to relinquish most of these gains at the Treaty of Aix-la-Chapelle. Louis XIV now decided achieving his objectives in the Netherlands was best done by attacking the Dutch directly. When France invaded the Dutch Republic in May 1672, at first it seemed they had won an overwhelming victory. However, by July the Dutch position had stabilised, while concern at French gains brought them support from Frederick William of Brandenburg-Prussia, Emperor Leopold and Charles II of Spain. 

In August 1672, an Imperial army entered the Rhineland, forcing Louis into a war of attrition around the French frontiers. The French army in Germany was led by Turenne, often considered the greatest general of the period. Over the next two years, he won a series of victories over superior Imperial forces led by Alexander von Bournonville and Raimondo Montecuccoli, the one commander contemporaries considered his equal. 

After 1673, it became a largely defensive campaign, focused on protecting French gains in the Rhineland and preventing Imperial forces linking up with the Dutch. France was over-extended, a problem that increased when Denmark–Norway joined the Alliance in January, 1674, while England and the Dutch Republic made peace in the February Treaty of Westminster.

Although the main campaign of 1674 was fought in Flanders, an Imperial army opened a second front in Alsace when Bournonville crossed the Rhine at Strasbourg, with over 40,000 men. This was a diplomatic coup for Emperor Leopold, since despite being a Free Imperial city, Strasbourg had previously been neutral and its bridge was a major crossing point. Bournonville now halted, waiting for another 20,000 men provided by Frederick William; once combined, they would overwhelm the smaller French army and invade eastern France.

The campaign that began in June 1674 and ended with his death in July 1675 has been described as 'Turenne's most brilliant.' Despite being out-numbered, he attacked Bournonville on 4 October before he could be reinforced; although the Battle of Entzheim was indecisive, the Imperials withdrew, entering winter quarters around Colmar, where they were joined by Frederick William's troops. Although it was normal practice to avoid campaigning during the winter, Turenne went on the offensive. He marched south, using the Vosges mountains to screen his movements from the Imperial commanders and reached Belfort on 27 December (see Map).

Battle

Although the arrival of French troops at Belfort took Bournonville by surprise, Turenne was forced to delay his attack on Alsace in order to gather supplies. Learning from prisoners the Imperial forces were concentrated at Colmar and Altkirch, Turenne decided to split them by advancing through Mulhouse, then a free city associated with Switzerland. To do this, he set off with an advance guard of 3,000 cavalry, leaving his infantry to follow as soon as possible. 

Bournonville hoped to hold a line along the Ill River until his army could assemble and the delay in the French advance allowed Hermann of Baden-Baden and around 5,000 Imperial cavalry men to occupy Mulhouse. Moving north from Altkirch toward Colmar, Turenne reached the Ill near Mulhouse on 29 December, where he found seven Imperial squadrons deployed along the river bank. As the river was fordable at this point, Turenne ordered Montauban to attack and the battle quickly escalated as both commanders fed in reinforcements. 

As this contest was going on, Turenne deployed a large force on his right, which advanced with as much fanfare as possible, giving the impression the whole French army was arriving. The Imperial cuirassiers fell back into Mulhouse and the entire force withdrew in disorder, some escaping toward Basel to take refuge in Switzerland. Turenne lost 60 men, including Montauban who had been captured; sources disagree on Imperial casualties, one suggesting they exceeded 1,300 including prisoners. This seems inflated for what was a relatively minor engagement, and the lower figure of 300 seems more likely.

Aftermath

Turenne returned to his main force at Belfort, which was finally ready to resume its advance on Colmar in early January; on 5 January, he defeated Bournonville at the Battle of Turckheim, forcing the Imperial army out of Alsace.

References

Sources
 
 
 
 
 
 {{cite book|last=Dodge|first=Theodore Ayrault|title=Gustavus Adolphus: A History of the Art of War from its Revival After the Middle Ages to the End of the Spanish Succession War, with a Detailed Account of the Campaigns of the Great Swede, and of the Most Famous Campaigns of Turenne, Conde, Eugene, and Marlborough, Vol II|publisher=Houghton, Mifflin and Company|year=1890}}
 
 
 A Relation or Journal of the Campaigns of the Marechal de Turenne, in the Years One Thousand Six Hundred Seventy Four, and One Thousand Six Hundred Seventy Five; 'Til the Time of His Death.  Done from the French, By an Officer of the Army''. Dublin: Addison's Head, 1732.
 
 
 

Mulhouse
Mulhouse 1674
1674 in Europe
Mulhouse 1674
Mulhouse 1674
Mulhouse 1674
Franco-Dutch War